The Chevrolet and GMC B series was a series of cowled chassis that were produced by General Motors.  Produced across three generations from 1966 to 2003, the model line was a variant of medium-duty trucks marketed under the Chevrolet and GMC nameplates.  Initially derived from the medium-duty C/K series, later examples were derived from the GMT530 architecture.

The B-series was constructed as a cowled-chassis design; also known as an incomplete vehicle, all bodywork aft of the firewall was produced by a second-stage manufacturer.  While primarily used for school bus applications, General Motors offered the chassis for multiple commercial and specialty uses.

Following 2003 production, the B-series was discontinued as GM concentrated on bus production derived from cutaway cabs.  Until its 2009 discontinuation, the medium-duty GMT560 chassis was used for bus applications (only in a cutaway configuration).  As of current production, General Motors provides bus chassis for both school bus and commercial bus applications, deriving all production from the light-duty GMT610 (Chevrolet Express/GMC Savana) cutaway van.

Background 
Prior to 1966, all medium- and heavy-duty trucks of General Motors were derived heavily from the C/K series trucks (and the Task Force trucks before them).  Although using a stronger frame and suspension, much of the bodywork was shared.  With the exception of divisionally-produced engines, the Chevrolet and GMC medium-duty trucks were largely identical to one another.  Consequently, the conventional-type school bus chassis used for both divisions were largely the same.

First generation (1966–1983) 

For 1966, GMC ended the use of a shared conventional bus chassis as it debuted its own version derived from its H-series heavy truck line; Chevrolet debuted its own design in 1967, derived from the C/K medium-duty line.  For 1971, both divisions consolidated conventional bus production solely to the C/K chassis.

For 1973, General Motors redesigned the entire C/K truck line, ranging from half-ton pickups to medium-duty trucks.  As Chevrolet and GMC had only adopted the C/K chassis together in 1971, GM would continue the production of the 1967-generation chassis for another decade.  After 16 years as a Chevrolet and 12 years of production as a GMC, the first-generation C/K bus chassis was retired after 1983.

Chevrolet (1967–1983)  
In 1967, Chevrolet moved the medium-duty C/K to a dedicated chassis, taking the school bus chassis with it.  As with the previous generation, the design was a rear-hinged "alligator"-design hood.  The division offered its conventional school bus chassis with Chevrolet-produced engines, including the 250 inline-6 (replaced by the 292 inline-6), 366 V8, and 427 V8.  In both Chevrolet and GMC school buses, the Allison AT475 3-speed automatic transmission became an option in 1971 with single or two-speed rear axles.

In 1974, the powertrain lineup was modified, as all GMC-built engines were dropped (alongside all diesel engines).  In 1980, a diesel engine made its return as Detroit Diesel introduced an 8.2L  V8.  Dubbed the "Fuel Pincher", it was the first four-stroke engine produced by the company; the engine was available in naturally-aspirated and turbocharged forms.

GMC (1966–1970) 

In 1966, the GMC division moved its school bus chassis from the medium-duty C/K to the all new H6500 heavy truck. A forerunner of both the GMC Brigadier and GMC General, the H-series trucks featured an all-steel front fascia with a center-hinged "butterfly" hood for engine access.  Alongside GMC V6 and V8 gasoline engines, GMC school bus chassis were available with Detroit Diesel 6V53 V6 diesels.

In 1969, GMC transitioned its medium-duty trucks to the Chevrolet-based C/K medium-duty chassis introduced in 1967.  The heavy-duty GMC school bus chassis remained in use by the division for 1970, before both divisions consolidated designs for 1971.

Second generation (1984–1991)

While General Motors redesigned its entire light and medium-duty C/K truck line for 1973, Chevrolet and GMC retained the previous-generation cowled bus chassis for nearly another decade.  For 1984, a second generation was introduced, consolidating conventional trucks and cowled bus chassis for the first time.  Codenamed B6, the redesign was again shared by both Chevrolet and GMC, differing only in grille design.  From the drivers' compartment, the B6 chassis shared the steering column with its predecessor (with nearly the same instrument panel).

In a major design change, the rear-hinged hood was replaced by a standard front-hinged tilting hood, allowing improved engine access.  The 6.0L (366) and 7.0L (427) V8 engines made their return, along with the 8.2L Detroit Diesel "Fuel Pincher" V8.  In 1990, the 8.2L engine was discontinued.

In 1985, General Motors developed a modified version of the B series for Ward Body Works as a chassis for the Ward Patriot school bus.  To allow for a shortened hood (to improve driver visibility), the front chassis of the C/K conventional was shortened for a configuration similar to that of the smaller Chevrolet/GMC P-chassis.  The "semi-forward control" design would be developed further by GM with the Thomas Vista, another bus that would use a GM B-series chassis during its production.

Third generation (1993–2003)

For 1990, General Motors introduced its GMT530 medium-duty truck platform under the Chevrolet Kodiak/GMC TopKick branding.  The GMT530 chassis consolidated multiple product lines; along with the 1980-1989 Kodiak/TopKick, the model line replaced the medium-duty C/K (along with the heavy-duty GMC Brigadier).

After producing the second-generation B-series chassis through 1991, GM skipped the 1992 model year entirely, with the first GMT530 bus chassis marked as 1993 production.  While fitted with a lower hoodline than its predecessor, the chassis was fitted with a much larger grille; only divisional badging differentiated Chevrolet and GMC versions from each other.

For 1997, GM rebranded the GMT530 trucks as the C5500-8500 series (dropping the external Kodiak/TopKick nameplates).  The low-profile hood offered on medium-duty trucks was not offered on the B-series, retaining the higher-profile standard/severe-service hood.

For 2003, the GMT530 platform was replaced by the GMT560 medium-duty architecture, ending production of the third-generation B-series by the end of 2003.  For bus applications, the GMT560 chassis was developed for use as a cutaway-cab vehicle; while some were bodied as school buses, most examples saw use in commercial applications.

Powertrain details 
In line with its predecessor, the third-generation B-series was offered with a range of gasoline and diesel engines.  The 7.0L V8 was discontinued, leaving the 6.0L V8 as the sole gasoline engine.  As part of the 1997 GMT530 revision, the 6.0L V8 was replaced by the Vortec 7.4L V8; in 2001, an all-new 8.1L V8 (one of the largest gasoline engines ever used in a school bus) became the gasoline engine.  As gasoline engines fell out of favor in large school buses during the 1990s, GM would become the final manufacturer to offer a full-size bus chassis with a gasoline-fuel engine, with the 8.1L V8 serving as the final example from 2003 to 2016.

Alongside the standard gasoline V8, the GMT530 was offered with multiple diesel engine offerings as an option.  Initially offered with the Caterpillar 3116 inline-6, the Caterpillar 3126 inline-6 became an option in 1997.

The GMT530 chassis was offered with 5 or 6-speed manual transmissions, along with multiple Allison automatic transmissions.  The model line was also offered with multiple options for alternative-fuel configurations.  Alongside conversions of gasoline engines to use LPG (propane), the GMT530 was also offered with options to use CNG (compressed natural gas).

Blue Bird CV200
Prior to 1992, the General Motors cowled bus chassis was available for use to any bus body manufacturer.  That year, GM entered a supply and marketing agreement with body manufacturer Blue Bird; for the next 10 years, Blue Bird became the exclusive manufacturer to body the then-new GMT530 cowled chassis, naming the result the Blue Bird CV200.  Under the agreement, the GM B-7 (external code name for the GMT530-based bus chassis) became standard equipment for all Blue Bird Conventionals, although International and Ford (later, Freightliner) chassis were allowed as options.

The 1992 supply agreement was among a series of 1990s mergers and acquisitions between body manufacturers and chassis suppliers of school buses.  Coinciding with its declining share of medium-duty truck production, the agreement would cripple the market share of GM as a supplier of full-size cowled bus chassis.  After failing to renew its supply agreement with Blue Bird in 2002, General Motors was effectively shut out of full-size chassis production, as both body manufacturers competing with Blue Bird were wholly owned by the largest competitors of GM in the medium-duty segment.

For 2004 production, Blue Bird introduced the Blue Bird Vision, marking the first cowled-chassis school bus to use a proprietary chassis (not shared with a medium-duty truck).

Usage by body manufacturers
While used nearly exclusively for school bus use, the B-series chassis was adapted for a wide variety of uses by body manufacturers, ranging from bookmobiles to police buses.  In the school bus industry, the General Motors chassis was popular for its wide range of engines.  During the 1980s and 1990s, its continued use of gasoline engines remained popular, as the powerplants were sometimes used as the basis for conversion to alternative fuels, including LPG (propane) and CNG (compressed natural gas).

Following the chassis and supply agreement between General Motors and Blue Bird in 1992, the B series was bodied exclusively by that company, nearly exclusively as a school bus.

Blue Bird (1966-2003)
Carpenter Industries, Inc. (1966-1991)
Gillig Bros. (1966-c.1980)
New Bus Company (1987-1988)
Northern Coach (1977-1978)
Perley A. Thomas Car Works (1966-1972)
Superior Coach Company (1966-1980, 1982–1985)
Thomas Built Buses, Inc. (1972-1991)
Ward Body Works (1966-1991)
Wayne Corporation (1966-1991)

See also

Chevrolet Kodiak/GMC TopKick – B-series donor platform (1993–2003)
Ford B series, International Harvester S-series "Schoolmaster", and International 3800 – competing school bus chassis
 List of buses

References

School bus chassis
Vehicles introduced in 1966
General Motors buses
B series
B series